The 1905 Tipperary Senior Hurling Championship was the 16th staging of the Tipperary Senior Hurling Championship since its establishment by the Tipperary County Board in 1887.

Two-Mile Borris won the championship after receiving a walkover from Lorrha in the final. It was their third championship title overall and their first title since 1903.

References

Tipperary
Tipperary Senior Hurling Championship